Ben McAllister (born in Stockport, Greater Manchester) is an English lacrosse player. He was a goalie for both Stockport Lacrosse Club and for the England men's national lacrosse team.

Awards

References 

 

British lacrosse players
People from Stockport
1977 births
Living people